Meniscolophus is an extinct genus of Diprotodontia known from the early Pliocene of the Tirari Desert, South Australia.

References
  Long, J., Archer, M., Flannery, T., & Hand, S. (2002) Prehistoric mammals of Australia and New Guinea: One hundred million years of evolution. University of New South Wales Press (page 79)

Prehistoric vombatiforms
Prehistoric marsupial genera
Prehistoric mammals of Australia
Pliocene marsupials
Fossil taxa described in 1955